Brodno  is a village in the administrative district of Gmina Środa Śląska, within Środa Śląska County, Lower Silesian Voivodeship, in south-western Poland.

The village has an approximate population of 300.

References

Brodno